Tragocephala guerinii is a species of beetle in the family Cerambycidae. It was described by White in 1856. It has a wide distribution in Africa. It feeds on Calliandra houstoniana var. calothyrsus and Theobroma cacao.

Varietas
 Tragocephala guerinii var. buquetii Thomson, 1857
 Tragocephala guerinii var. aurivilliusi Plavilstshikov, 1927
 Tragocephala guerinii var. jordani Breuning, 1934
 Tragocephala guerinii var. irregularis Aurivillius, 1913
 Tragocephala guerinii var. senatoria Chevrolat, 1858
 Tragocephala guerinii var. dilatata Aurivillius, 1913

References

guerinii
Beetles described in 1856